Firebase Vera was a U.S. Army firebase located near the Cambodian border southwest of Pleiku in the central highlands of Vietnam.

History
Vera was constructed in October 1968 by the 1st Battalion, 35th Infantry approximately 6 km from the Cambodian border, 8 km south of Đức Cơ Camp and 50 km southwest of Pleiku.

Vera was assaulted by People's Army of Vietnam (PAVN) sappers under cover of mortar fire on the early morning of 14 November 1968, the assault was repulsed for the loss of 6 U.S. and 6 PAVN killed.

Units based at Vera included:
3rd Battalion, 8th Infantry
1st Battalion, 22nd Infantry
2nd Battalion, 9th Artillery
1st Battalion, 92nd Artillery

Current use
The base has been turned over to farmland.

References

Installations of the United States Army in South Vietnam
Buildings and structures in Kon Tum province